Lucchese may refer to:
 A.S. Lucchese Libertas 1905, a football team based in Lucca, Tuscany
 Lucchese crime family, one of the "Five Families" of New York City's Mafia
 Lucchese School, an art school in Tuscany, Italy that flourished in the 11th and 12th centuries
 Lucchese Boot Company, a Western-style boot company from Texas

People with the surname
 Antonio Franchi (1638–1709), Italian painter called Il Lucchese
 Giuseppe Lucchese (born 1959), Sicilian mobster
 Josephine Lucchese (1893–1974), American opera singer
 Laurent Lucchese (born 1973), French rugby league footballer who played in the 1990s
 Sam Lucchese (1868–1929), Italian-born founder of Lucchese Boot Company and theater owner in San Antonio, Texas
 Tommy Lucchese (1899–1967), New York mobster and former boss of the Lucchese crime family

See also 
 Lucca, an Italian city and province
 Lucca Sicula, a town in the Province of Agrigento, Sicily, Italy
 Lucchesi (surname)